As a nickname, Fireball or the Fireball may refer to:

 Jim Colzie (1920–2010), Negro league baseball pitcher
 Fireball Roberts, Jr. (1929–1964), NASCAR driver
 Josh Urbiztondo (born 1983), Filipino-American Philippine Basketball Association player nicknamed "The Fireball"
 Fred Wenz (1941–2020), Major League Baseball middle relief pitcher

See also 

Lists of people by nickname